Tom Clancy's Politika is a Risk-like game for the PC made by Red Storm Entertainment based on the Tom Clancy's Power Plays novel "Politika".

References

External links

1997 video games
Classic Mac OS games
Cold War video games
Java platform games
North America-exclusive video games
Red Storm Entertainment games
Single-player video games
Tom Clancy games
Tom Clancy's Power Plays
Ubisoft games
Video games developed in the United States
Video games set in Russia
Windows games